Janet Taylor Lisle (born 1947) is an American author of children's books and young adult novels that range between fantasy and reality.

Early years 

Lisle was born in Englewood, New Jersey. She grew up in rural Farmington, Connecticut, and spent her summers in Rhode Island. Growing up with four younger brothers, Lisle and the rest of her siblings were all passionate readers. She was educated at local schools until age fifteen when she entered the Ethel Walker School, a girl's boarding school in Simsbury, Connecticut.

Higher education, career, and life 
Lisle attended Smith College in Northampton, Massachusetts and graduated in 1969 with a degree in English. Following graduation, she married and joined VISTA (Volunteers in Service to America) in Atlanta, Georgia. In 1971, she returned to college at Georgia State University to take journalism classes. After an internship at the Atlanta Journal/Constitution, she worked as a reporter for local newspapers in the Atlanta area and later in Westchester County, New York. 
With a new marriage and the birth of her daughter in 1977, Lisle changed her career path and began to write children's books at home. Her first book, The Dancing Cats of Appelsap, was inspired by her own childhood memories. Following this book, she has continued to write for a diverse audience and produced over sixteen novels as well as several works of history for adults.

Lisle lives on the Rhode Island coast with her husband, Richard Lisle. Her daughter Elizabeth and two grandchildren live in Berkeley, CA.

Book list 

 The Dancing Cats of Appelsap, illustrated by Joelle Shefts, Bradbury Press (Scarsdale, NY), 1984.
 Sirens and Spies, Bradbury Press (Scarsdale, NY), 1985.
 The Great Dimpole Oak, illustrated by Stephen Gammell, Orchard Books (New York, NY), 1987.
 Afternoon of the Elves, Orchard Books (New York, NY), 1989.
 The Lampfish of Twill, illustrated by Wendy Anderson Halperin, Orchard Books (New York, NY), 1991.
 Forest, Orchard Books (New York, NY), 1993.
 The Gold Dust Letters, Orchard Books (New York, NY), 1994.
 Looking for Juliette, Orchard Books (New York, NY), 1994.
 A Message from the Match Girl, Orchard Books (New York, NY), 1995.
 Angela's Aliens, Orchard Books (New York, NY), 1996.
 The Lost Flower Children, Philomel Books (New York, NY), 1999.
 The Art of Keeping Cool, Atheneum (New York, NY), 2000.
 How I Became a Writer and Oggie Learned to Drive, Philomel Books (New York, NY), 2002.
 The Crying Rocks, Atheneum (New York, NY), 2003
 Black Duck, Penguin Group (New York, NY), 2007
 Highway Cats, Penguin Group (New York, NY), 2008
 Quicksand Pond,  Atheneum Books for Young Readers (May 16, 2017)

External links 
 http://www.janettaylorlisle.com/
http://us.penguingroup.com/nf/Author/AuthorPage/0,,1000038434,00.html
http://authors.simonandschuster.com/Janet-Taylor-Lisle/1779461
 

1947 births
American children's writers
Living people
People from Englewood, New Jersey
Novelists from New Jersey
American young adult novelists
American women novelists
20th-century American novelists
21st-century American novelists
20th-century American women writers
Women writers of young adult literature
21st-century American women writers